Jane Georgiana Seymour, Duchess of Somerset (née Sheridan; 5 November 1809 – 14 December 1884), was the wife of Edward, Duke of Somerset.

Life
Jane Georgiana Sheridan was the third daughter of Thomas Sheridan and his wife the novelist Caroline Callander, daughter of Sir James Callander of Craigforth and Ardkinglas. She was the younger sister of Helen Lady Dufferin, songwriter, composer, poet, and author, and Caroline Norton, society beauty, feminist, social reformer, and author. Georgiana, Helen, and Caroline were the granddaughters of Irish playwright Richard Brinsley Sheridan. Known for her loveliness, the Duchess was chosen to be the "Queen of Beauty" at the Eglinton Tournament in 1839.

She married Edward, Duke of Somerset (then Lord Seymour) on the 10th of June 1830, when he was twenty-five and she was twenty. They had two sons and three daughters:

Lady Jane Hermione Seymour (1 January 1832 – 1909), married Sir Frederick Graham (1820 – 1888), and had issue (the Countess of Verulam and Duchess of Montrose)
Lady Ulrica Frederica Jane Seymour (12 January 1833 – 1916), married Lord Henry Thynne (1832 - 1904)
Edward Adolphus Ferdinand, Earl St. Maur (17 July 1835 – 1869), had two illegitimate children by his maid. The son Harold claimed he was legitimate and, after his father's death, declared himself heir to the Dukedom of Somerset 
Lord Edward Percy Seymour (19 August 1841 – 1865), diplomat, unmarried and without issue; died in India after being mauled by a bear 
Lady Helen Guendolen Seymour (1846 – 1910), married Sir John Ramsden (1831 – 1914)

The Duchess was survived by her husband by less than a year. She is interred at Gerrard's Cross, Buckinghamshire.

References 

1809 births
1884 deaths
English duchesses by marriage
Georgiana